Saipina is a small town in the Santa Cruz Department in Bolivia. It is the seat of the Saipina Municipality, the second municipal section of the Manuel María Caballero Province.  At the time of census 2001 it had 2,394 inhabitants.

References

Populated places in Santa Cruz Department (Bolivia)